Glyphipterix stasichlora is a species of sedge moth in the genus Glyphipterix. It was described by Edward Meyrick in 1931. It is found in Peru.

References

Moths described in 1931
Glyphipterigidae
Moths of South America